The Silver Bell Mountains are a northwest–southeast trending mountain range in north–central Pima County, Arizona.

The range is located to the east of the Ironwood Forest National Monument. Ragged Top, located in the north of the range, is a well-known landmark in this former mining region.

Description
The range is named after the Silver Bell Mine located at the southern end of the mountains. The range abuts the Waterman Mountains to the southeast, where palynology-(pollen) studies have shown some of the recent floristic history of Arizona during the Pliocene. Both ranges lie in the northeast Sonoran Desert; the Madrean Sky Island ranges begin just southeast of here, with the large, and most western sky island range, the Baboquivari Mountains-Quinlans 20–35 mi south.

The Silver Bell range can be accessed by Avra Valley Road and Silver Bell Road from the south of Marana.

Climate
Climate is characterized by extremely variable temperature conditions.  The Köppen Climate Classification sub-type for this climate is "Bsh" (Mid-Latitude Steppe and Desert Climate).

See also
 Ironwood Forest National Monument
 List of mountain ranges of Pima County, Arizona
 List of mountain ranges of Arizona

References

External links

Silver Bell Peak
 Silver Bell Peak, trails.com coord

Ragged Top Peak
 Ragged Top, summitpost.org
 Silver Bell area, including Ragged Top

Mountain ranges of the Sonoran Desert
Mountain ranges of Pima County, Arizona
Mountain ranges of Arizona